Due South was a British listings magazine which covered the region containing the Hampshire cities Southampton, Portsmouth and Winchester and the Dorset town Bournemouth.

Due South was among a number of provincial what's-on/entertainment guides produced during the late 1970s and early 1980s in a similar style to London's Time Out, City Limits and Event magazines. Other key regional listings magazines launched in the same period which formed a loose association with Due South included Manchesters City Life, Bristol's Venue, The List, which covered Glasgow and Edinburgh, and Dublin's In Dublin. 
 
Due South was produced fortnightly between 1981 and 1990. Originally the magazine began as a co-operative and was founded in Southampton by art student Mark Ovenden, who became the magazine's editor, and book-publisher Roger Hardingham. It went through various incarnations, including a freesheet, before settling down for several years as a limited company. The second editor was Sally O'Shaungnessy, who had begun as a freelance contributor to the arts pages.  The magazine featured on BBC Radio 1s Newsbeat, TVSs 'Coast to Coast' and in the Southampton Evening Echo. The Echo was at that stage the dominant force in local publishing and had a generally conservative outlook. Due South was the region's first credible widely-distributed consumer magazine with alternative, generally leftist politics.

Notable people associated with Due South
The magazine was predominantly run by young and enthusiastic volunteers and freelance contributors, many of whom went on to become well-recognised names in their field. Notable writers, photographers and cartoonists commissioned by the magazine and subsequently becoming professional include:
John Aizlewood Music and sports writer & broadcaster
Anne-Marie Blatchford Feminist cartoonist
Tony Crossley illustrator
Brin Edwards Illustrator
Martin Fletcher author 
Brian Hooper folk music writer
Mark Ovenden author and broadcaster
Jane Penston graphic designer
Allene Tuck Poet
Chris Walker jazz music writer

References

http://www.davidstjohn.co.uk/bobpearce.html
https://web.archive.org/web/20080516205556/http://www.kateshillpress.pwp.blueyonder.co.uk/AUTHORS.HTM

Defunct magazines published in the United Kingdom
Biweekly magazines published in the United Kingdom
Listings magazines
Magazines established in 1981
Magazines disestablished in 1990
Local interest magazines published in the United Kingdom
Consumer magazines